Tribunal Records is a heavy metal and hardcore punk label that started in 1999. The label also has a subsidiary entitled Divebomb Records. Tribunal has hosted bands such as From the Shallows, Scarlet, and Century, while Divebomb hosts bands such as Wulfhook, Zephaniah, and Helion Prime.

Current Artists 
 Blatant Disarray
 Colossus
 Dr. Living Dead
 Enemy Is Us
 Forté
 Inferi
 Iron Thrones
 Jonas Sees in Color
 Jonin
 KONG!
 Line of Fire
 Labyrinthe
 Vanisher
 Wombwrecker

Former Artists

Active 

 Atreyu (Victory/Hollywood)
 Bloodjiin (Pluto)
 Century (Prosthetic)
 Daylight Dies (Relapse/Candlelight)
 Dreamscapes of the Perverse
 From Autumn to Ashes
 He Is Legend (Tragic Hero)
 Her Candane
 Last Chance to Reason (Prosthetic)
 Liferuiner (inVogue Records)
 Six Reasons to Kill (Massacre Records)
 Slowmotion Apocalypse (Scarlet Records)
 Swift
 The Demonstration (Mediaskare Records)
 Vale of Pnath (Willotip Records)
 Widow (Pure Steel Records)
 Woe of Tyrants (Metal Blade Records)

Disbanded 
 Age of Ruin
 Animosity
 Brand New Disaster
 Canvas Solaris
 The Damascus Intervention
 Darkness Remains
 Deadsoil 
 Everafter
 The Feds
 Killwhitneydead
 A Thousand Times Repent
 Facedown
 Hyde

Hiatus or Unknown 
 Adios
 Amazing Device
 The Cardinal Effect
 From the Shallows
 The Kiss of Death
 Samadhi
 Scarlet (Ferret Music)
 Sever the Fallen
 Since the Day
 The Taste of Blood
 The Underwater

References

External links
 Tribunal Records tag on Lambgoat
 

American record labels
Hardcore record labels
Heavy metal record labels